Gabriela Amaral dos Santos (born 1 August 1978), known professionally as Gaby Amarantos, is a Brazilian singer, songwriter, actress and TV presenter from the city of Belém.

Biography 
Amarantos was born in the low-income neighborhood of Jurunas in Belém, in the state of Pará, Brazil. She is of mixed indigenous Amazonian and Afro-Brazilian descent. She began singing in the local church of Santa Teresinha do Menino Jesus, and at the age of 15 began to perform on the local bar scene.

Born into a family of samba enthusiasts, Amarantos was also influenced at an early age by the Caribbean radio frequencies that reached equatorial Belém, along with brega, lambada, Clara Nunes, Kraftwerk, and Juan Luis Guerra. Later, the electronic aparelhagem soundsystem parties in Jurunas would have a strong impact on her musical direction.

In 2002, she rose to fame in Pará state as the emerging star of the tecno brega scene fronting Banda Tecno Show and performing Portuguese covers of Cyndi Lauper and Roxete.

In 2011, she achieved national success with a version of "Single Ladies", gaining the nickname "Amazonian Beyonce", followed by the 2012 hit single and telenovela soundtrack "Ex Mai Love".

Discography

Studio albums

Singles

Awards and nominations

References

External links 

 Musa do tecnobrega, Gaby Amarantos festeja música do Norte 
 http://palinstravels.co.uk/book-4748

1978 births
Living people
Afro-Brazilian people
People from Belém
People from Pará
21st-century Brazilian singers
21st-century Brazilian women singers
Women in Latin music